"In Pieces" was the second single to be taken from Australian singer Shannon Noll's third album, Turn It Up (2007). The track was released as a CD single on 26 November 2007 and reached number 26 on the Australian Singles Chart.

Track listings
Australian CD single
 "In Pieces"
 "Tomorrow"

Australian digital EP
 "In Pieces" – 3:34
 "Tomorrow" – 3:58
 "Walls" (live at The Basement)  – 3:44

Charts

References

2007 singles
2007 songs
Shannon Noll songs
Sony BMG singles